The Spanish missions in Mexico are a series of religious outposts established by Spanish Catholic Franciscans, Jesuits, Augustinians, and Dominicans to spread the Christian doctrine among the local natives. Since 1493, the Kingdom of Spain had maintained a number of missions throughout Nueva España (New Spain, consisting of what is today Mexico, the Southwestern United States, the Florida and the Luisiana, Central America, the Spanish Caribbean and the Philippines) in order to preach the gospel to these lands. In 1533, at the request of Hernán Cortés, Carlos V  sent the first Franciscan friars with orders to establish a series of installations throughout the country.

Missions

 Mission La Purísima Concepción de Caborca, in Caborca, Sonora
 Mission San Antonio de Oquitoa, in Oquitoa, Sonora
Mission San Diagos de Pitiquito Mission, in Pitiquito, Sonora
 Mission San Francisco Solano in Coahuila
 Mission San Ignacio de Cabórica, in Sonora
 Mission San Jeronimo, in Aldama, Chihuahua
 Mission San Juan Bautista in Coahuila
 Mission San Pedro y San Pablo del Tubutama, in Tubutama, Sonora
Mission Santa Maria Magdalena, in Sonora
 Mission Santa Rosalía in Camargo, Chihuahua
 Mission Santiago y Nuestra Señora del Pilar de Cocóspera, in Cocóspera, Sonora
 Mission Dulce Nombre de Jesus de Peyotes in Villa Union, Coahuila
 Mission San Andres in Nava, Coahuila
 Mission San Buenaventura de la Consolación in San Buenaventura, Coahuila
 Mission Nuestra Señora de Dolores de la Punta in Lampazos, Coahuila
 Mission San Bernardino de la Candela in Candela, Coahuila
 Mission San Buenaventura in Cuatrocienegas, Coahuila
 Mission Santa Rosa de Nadadores in Nadadores, Coahuila
 Mission San Francisco de Saltillo in Saltillo, Coahuila
 Mission San Miguel de Aguayo in Monclova, Coahuila
 Franciscan Missions in the Sierra Gorda of Querétaro
 Monasteries on the slopes of Popocatépetl

See also
 Jesuit Asia missions
 Jesuit Reductions
 List of the oldest churches in Mexico
 Reductions

References

External links
 Mexico's colonial era — Part II: Religion & Society in New Spain
 Mission Churches of the Sonoran Desert

 01
.
Mexico
.